Konstantin Tupikov (born 25 April 1983) is a former competitive figure skater who represented Ukraine until 2005 and then decided to compete for Poland. He is the 2003 Ukrainian national champion and 2008 Polish national champion.

Programs

Results

For Poland

For Ukraine
JGP: Junior Grand Prix

References

External links

Navigation

1983 births
Living people
Polish male single skaters
Ukrainian male single skaters
Sportspeople from Odesa